Gossypium raimondii is a species of cotton plant endemic to northern Peru. Its genome has been sequenced in order to improve the productivity and fiber quality of other Gossypium species.

References 

raimondii
Endemic flora of Peru